Berges de la Garonne tram stop is located on line B of the Tramway de Bordeaux.

For most of the day on Mondays to Fridays, trams run at least every ten minutes. Services run less frequently in the early morning, late evenings, weekends and public holidays.

The tram stop is situated in the central reservation of Avenue du Docteur Schinazi and has just one platform, serving the single terminal track that continues south to Claveau.

References 

Bordeaux tramway stops
Tram stops in Bordeaux
Railway stations in France opened in 2008